Grupo México is a Mexican conglomerate that operates through the following divisions: Mining (Minera Mexico), Transportation (GMxT), Infrastructure and Fundacion Grupo Mexico. 

Its mining Division is the leading Copper producer in Mexico and the third largest copper producer in the world through ASARCO.

Its transportation division operates the largest rail fleet in México, with 11,000 km of track and more than 800 engines and 26,300 coaches. It interconnects five major inland Mexican cities, five cities along the border with the United States, 13 seaports (5 on the Pacific Ocean, and 8 on the Gulf of Mexico).

History

The company was founded by Raúl Antonio Escobedo and Larrea Mota Velasco in 1978. After the government of Carlos Salinas declared the state mining company bankrupt, Larrea purchased key Mexican copper mines in Cananea and Nacozari (cities in the state of Sonora). He also purchased numerous other mining sites, including coal mines in the state of Coahuila. By 2000, Grupo México was responsible for 87.5 percent of Mexico's copper production and is the world's third-largest copper producer.

Grupo México has been in continual conflict with Local 65, the Cananea branch of the Mexican Mine Workers' Union (SNTMMSRM). During miners' strikes in January 2003 and October 2004, Grupo México responded with threats to close the Cananea mines. 

In 2004, Grupo México purchased a controlling interest in the Southern Peru Copper Corporation.  Grupo Mexico acquired 54.2% equity interest in Southern Peru Copper Corporation from ASARCO LLC, a mining company operating in the United States. The SPCC equity sale is subject to a litigation between Grupo Mexico and ASARCO pending in the U.S. District Court for the Southern District of Texas under District Court Judge Andrew Hanen. As of September 2009, ASARCO was the focus of a bidding war begun in May 2008 between its own parent company Grupo México and India-based Sterlite Industries. On August 31, 2009, U.S. Bankruptcy Judge Richard Schmidt recommended that U.S. District Judge Andrew Hanen accept Grupo México's $2.5 billion bid for ASARCO as it prepares to come out of bankruptcy.

Pollution and environmental issues

Cases in the US through ASARCO

Asarco has been found responsible for environmental pollution at 20 Superfund sites across the U.S. by the Environmental Protection Agency. Those sites are:
Interstate Lead Company, or ILCO, labeled EPA Site ALD041906173, and located in Leeds, Jefferson County, Alabama
Argo Smelter, Omaha & Grant Smelter, labeled EPA Site COD002259588, and located at Vasquez Boulevard and I-70 in Denver, Colorado
Smeltertown, a copper smelter used to illegally dispose of hazardous waste, in El Paso, El Paso County, Texas. The plant has since been dismantled.
California Gulch mine and river systems in Leadville, Colorado;
Summitville Consolidated Mining Corp., Inc. (SCMCI), now bankrupt, EPA Site COD983778432, in Del Norte, Rio Grande County, Colorado;
ASARCO Globe Plant, EPA Site COD007063530, Globeville, near South Platte River, Denver and Adams County, Colorado;
Bunker Hill Mining and Metallurgical, Coeur d'Alene River Basin, Idaho;
Kin-Buc Landfill in New Jersey;
Tar Creek Superfund site (Ottawa County) lead and zinc operations and surrounding residences in Oklahoma;
Commencement Bay, Near Shore/Tide Flats smelter, groundwater, and residences in Tacoma and Ruston, Washington.

Cases in Mexico

Sea of Cortés acid spill
On July 9, 2019, 3,000 liters of sulfuric acid spilled into the Sea of Cortés from Grupo México-owned pipes near the city of Guaymas, in northwestern Mexico.  Three people were injured, and videos appeared online documenting the "sad and harrowing" local damage to marine wildlife as a consequence of the spill.

Pasta de Conchos mine disaster

On February 19, 2006, an explosion occurred in a coal mine in San Juan de Sabinas, Coahuila, that is owned by Grupo México. 
It was reported that mine workers had gone on strike against Grupo México at least 14 times, "not only for salary increases… but because of its constant refusal to review security and health measures." Grupo México said that they, in conjunction with the mining union, signed a certificate on February 7, 2006 declaring the mine safe.

Although the mining operations of a coal deposit is always a risky business, due to the possibility of huge gas concentrations, there are certain theories that indicate the mine has an important lack of safety rules, very similar to the problem presented in the Sago Mine disaster in West Virginia with the accident that caused death of 12 miners on January 2, 2006. Union critics of the company openly refer to the incident as a "homicide."

After the successful rescue of 33 trapped miners in October 2010 in Copiapó, Chile, the case gained popularity again, and many people including bishop Raúl Vera demanded that the case be reopened. Grupo México has not responded.

According to the IndustriALL Global Union, as of August 2016, "Ten years after the mining homicide at Pasta de Conchos, Mexico, the government has still not conducted a thorough investigation into the real causes of the disaster, brought those responsible to justice, recovered the bodies or compensated the families of the victims."

Rio Sonora spill
On August 6, 2014 40,000 cubic meters of copper sulphate were spilled on Sonora River and Bacanuchi River by Buenavista del Cobre mine. This has been considered the largest environmental spillage in Mexico's history, polluting 7 municipal districts from Sonora state and affecting by October more than 20,000 people. Pollution has been reported to be reaching Arizona.
Though a trust fund was created to assist the damaged population, complains about its management and proper ecological cleaning have been expressed.
A second spillage, this time sulfur dioxide, was reported.

Rail operations (GMxT, Ferromex)

Grupo Ferroviario Mexicano, S.A. de C.V.

Runs Mexico's largest and most profitable railway with near 11,000 kilometres of tracks and 15,000 carloads, transporting over 40% of all the rail cargo of the country. 

GMEXICO acquired the rail concession from the Mexican federal government for 100 years in 1998. GMEXICO owns 74% and Union Pacific 26% of the company. The railway, known as FERROMEX, has the largest coverage of the nation's railway system. The rail system connects the main cities in the country, where 70% of industrial production is created and services five land ports on the border with USA, four seaports on the Pacific Ocean and two on the Gulf of Mexico.

Intermodal México, S.A. de C.V.
Operates since November 2001. Its objective is to develop and provide multi-modal services and logistics for load transportation. For such purposes it has constructed facilities in Guadalajara, Monterrey, Torreón, Silao, Saltillo and is in the process of constructing several other facilities in major cities of central and Northern Mexico.

Texas Pacifico, Inc.
Holds and operates the Texas Pacifico railroad in the United States that interconnects the border point Ojinaga, Chihuahua–Presidio, Texas with the city of Fort Worth, Texas.

FERROSUR
On November 25, 2005, the railroad division acquired the company Ferrosur, creating a monopoly over the industry. This Transaction was duly notified to the Mexican Antitrust Commission.

Florida East Coast Railway
Grupo Mexico acquired Florida East Coast Railway in 2017.

Carbon footprint
Grupo México reported Total CO2e emissions (Direct + Indirect) for the twelve months ending 31 December 2020 at 5,810 Kt (-560 /-8.8% y-o-y). This follows a 19% reduction in 2019.

See also 
List of companies traded on the Bolsa Mexicana de Valores
List of Mexican companies
Economy of Mexico

Notes
  US Geological Survey; Gillian O'Connor, "LatAm copper giants want place on global stage," Financial Times, 24 August 2000.
  "Grupo Mexico Threatens to Shut Down Cananea if Strike Continues," Engineering and Mining Journal, Vol. 204, No. 4, February 2003, pages 14–15; "Workers Strike at Mexican Copper Mine," Associated Press, 15 October 2004.
  Sara Silver, "Approval expected for Grupo Mexico/ S Peru Copper," Financial Times, 23 October 2004.
  "Mexican mine blast traps workers," BBC News, 20 February 2006. Link to article

References

External links
Grupo México
Profile on Yahoo! Finance

Copper mining companies of Mexico
Silver mining companies of Mexico
Companies listed on the Mexican Stock Exchange
Non-renewable resource companies established in 1978
Mexican companies established in 1978
Companies based in Mexico City
Conglomerate companies of Mexico